The 1999 FIA Formula One World Championship was the 53rd season of Fédération Internationale de l'Automobile (FIA) Formula One motor racing. It commenced on 7 March and ended on 31 October after sixteen races.

The Drivers' Championship was won for a second consecutive time by Mika Häkkinen, although Eddie Irvine, David Coulthard and Heinz-Harald Frentzen all had a chance of winning the title at various stages. However, Schumacher's participation in the 1999 championship was cut short due to injury at the British Grand Prix, where he suffered a broken leg in a crash. He returned for the last two races of the season in order to assist Irvine in his championship run.

The championship finale was set up in controversial circumstances: at the inaugural Malaysian Grand Prix, Ferrari took first and second places, but were disqualified for a breach of the technical regulations. They were reinstated on appeal, ensuring that Irvine had the title lead before the final race in Japan. If Schumacher won, fourth or higher would seal the title for Irvine. Schumacher took pole but lost the start to Häkkinen who then drove away at the front, never being troubled for position by Schumacher in spite of his running close all race. Had Ferrari switched their cars Irvine would have still lost the title on countback due to Häkkinen's five wins compared with Irvine's four. In the end Irvine finished a distant third and fell short in his championship title bid.

The season saw successes for the Jordan and Stewart teams, with Heinz-Harald Frentzen finishing third in the title race for Jordan and Johnny Herbert winning Stewart's first and only Grand Prix victory at the Nürburgring. The season also saw former dominant team Williams run a second season in a row without victories in spite of a few podiums from breakthrough youngster Ralf Schumacher, with two-time Champ Car champion Alessandro Zanardi finishing the season without scoring points. Former Williams driver and 1997 world champion Jacques Villeneuve had joined the new British American Racing team, and also finished the season with no points, having retired from 12 of the 16 races.

Drivers and constructors
The following teams and drivers competed in the 1999 FIA Formula One World Championship. All teams competed with tyres supplied by Bridgestone.

† All engines were 3.0 litre, V10 configuration.

Team changes

After three decades in the sport, the Tyrrell team was sold to British American Tobacco and its entry was used by the new British American Racing (BAR) team, with Supertec engines replacing the Ford-Cosworth units of the previous season.

Goodyear, who had supplied Williams, Ferrari, Jordan, Sauber and Tyrrell throughout 1998, left Formula One at the end of the season, temporarily leaving Bridgestone as the only tyre supplier while Formula One sought a competitor. The grooved tyres introduced in 1998 now had four grooves on all tyres; the front tyres previously had three.

Driver changes
Williams entered the season with an all-new driver pairing. Ralf Schumacher, who had driven for Jordan in 1998, switched to Williams for the new season, and was partnered with Alessandro Zanardi, whose last stint in Formula One, for Lotus, had ended at the end of the 1994 season. In the meantime, the Italian had won the 1997 and 1998 CART titles for Chip Ganassi Racing. Heinz-Harald Frentzen completed a straight swap with the younger Schumacher, taking the vacant seat at Jordan alongside 1996 champion Damon Hill. Frentzen's 1998 teammate, the 1997 World Drivers' Champion Jacques Villeneuve, moved to the newly founded BAR team, which also utilised a completely new lineup. Villeneuve was partnered with the 1998 McLaren test driver and FIA GT1 champion Ricardo Zonta, one of three rookies on the grid at the beginning of the season.

1998 Tyrrell driver Ricardo Rosset retired from racing after leaving the team at the end of the season, while his teammate, Toranosuke Takagi competed for Arrows in 1999, where he was joined by Jordan's test driver from the previous season, Pedro de la Rosa, who also made his debut at the first race of the season. Pedro Diniz left Arrows to sign for Sauber. Diniz' teammate from 1998, Mika Salo was left without a full-time drive for 1999, but he later served as an injury replacement for both Ricardo Zonta at BAR for three races, and Ferrari's Michael Schumacher for six races, scoring one second place and one third for Ferrari. Johnny Herbert, whose Sauber seat was taken by Diniz, joined Rubens Barrichello at Stewart. The two drivers who had filled Stewart's second seat in 1998 were both absent from the Formula One grid in 1999: Jan Magnussen moved to the American Le Mans Series, while Jos Verstappen became the test driver for the aborted Honda F1 project.

Minardi also fielded a completely new driver pairing: Ferrari test driver Luca Badoer, who had been absent from the grid since the collapse of Forti midway through the 1996 season, drove alongside the third rookie driver, Marc Gené, who was the reigning Open Fortuna by Nissan champion. A wrist injury to Badoer meant that Prost test driver Stéphane Sarrazin made his F1 debut at the Brazilian Grand Prix, which would end up being the Frenchman's only ever race in the series. Shinji Nakano, who drove for Minardi in 1998, tested occasionally for Jordan in 1999, while his teammate, Esteban Tuero, who was also surplus to requirements at the Italian team, left Formula One to join the Argentinian TC 2000 Championship.

Calendar
The 1999 FIA Formula One World Championship comprised the following 16 races.

Calendar changes and proposed races
 The Malaysian Grand Prix was added to the calendar, held at a newly built circuit in Sepang.
 There were proposals for a Chinese Grand Prix to be held at the Zhuhai International Circuit. The race was included on the provisional calendar, with 21 March as its date, released on 15 October 1998. The race was removed from the calendar on 20 December 1998, due to unspecified problems. The race was proposed to be moved to the autumn but this did not occur. The Chinese Grand Prix ultimately joined the calendar in 2004, with the event held at the Shanghai International Circuit.
 The Argentine Grand Prix was added to the calendar on 20 December 1998 as a replacement for the cancelled Chinese Grand Prix, to be held at the Autódromo Juan y Oscar Gálvez as the second round of the season on 28 March, but was cancelled as well because of disagreements between the organizer and the commercial rights holder. This resulted in a five-week gap between the year's opening two races.
 The race at the Nurburgring was held under the European Grand Prix title once more having been held under the Luxembourg Grand Prix title in the 1997 and 1998 season

Report
The first round of the championship was in Australia and unsurprisingly, the two McLarens of Mika Häkkinen and David Coulthard started 1–2 ahead of Ferrari's Michael Schumacher. Schumacher, for the second consecutive race (after last year's final race), stalled on the parade lap and started at the back. The McLarens were first and second into the first corner, and then pulled away until both broke down, Coulthard when his gearbox failed and Häkkinen with electrical trouble. This left Eddie Irvine in the second Ferrari to take his first ever career win ahead of Jordan's Heinz-Harald Frentzen and Ralf Schumacher in the Williams.

The second race was originally to be in China on 21 March , then Argentina on 28 March, but both were cancelled before the season began. This left an unusual five-week gap before the next race, in Brazil.

Häkkinen and Coulthard started 1–2 again in Brazil, and Schumacher was outqualified by the Stewart of home hero Rubens Barrichello. Coulthard faltered at the start, and he had to be pushed into the pitlane, rejoining three laps down. Häkkinen looked dominant, but then got stuck in third gear temporarily, and was passed by Barrichello and Schumacher. Barrichello was on a two-stopper, and pitted early, leaving Schumacher leading only to be jumped by Häkkinen during the stops. Häkkinen won, ahead of Schumacher, and Frentzen took third after Barrichello's engine blew up.

The first European race of the season was in San Marino, and even though the 'tifosi' were out in full force for Ferrari, McLaren locked out the front row of the grid for the third successive race, and the Ferraris of Schumacher and Irvine were confined to the second row. Häkkinen, who was on a two-stopper, raced away from the field early on, only to lose control and crash on the 18th lap. This left Coulthard and Schumacher to battle it out, and the German jumped his rival in the stops to win, sending the tifosi wild. Coulthard was second, and after Irvine retired with an engine failure, Barrichello took third.

Häkkinen took pole again at Monaco, but Schumacher prevented a lockout of the front row, by beating Coulthard. Schumacher beat Häkkinen on the run to the first corner and then pulled away. Häkkinen lost even more time when he went up an escape road in Mirabeau, and lost out to Irvine and Coulthard. Coulthard retired from third with a mechanical failure soon after. Schumacher won by half a minute, with Irvine making it a Ferrari 1–2, and Häkkinen had to be content with third.

With a quarter of the season gone, Schumacher led the championship with 26 points, and teammate Irvine was second with 18. Häkkinen was third with 14, 12 points behind Schumacher, and only a point ahead of fourth-placed Frentzen. Ralf Schumacher and Giancarlo Fisichella had 7 points each. In the Constructors' Championship, Ferrari with 44 points had a big lead over McLaren with 20, and Jordan with 16.

The next race was in Spain, and Häkkinen took pole as usual, with Irvine a superb second ahead of Coulthard. Häkkinen got away well, but Irvine got away poorly, and Coulthard took second. To add to that, both Ferraris were passed by Jacques Villeneuve's BAR, and got stuck behind him. The McLarens disappeared into the distance, and Häkkinen cruised to victory, with Coulthard giving McLaren a 1–2 finish, while the Ferraris got by Villeneuve at the stops, and Schumacher finished third.

It was at the Canadian GP that Häkkinen's string of poles was broken, the Finn being pushed to second by Schumacher, with Irvine again qualifying in the top three. Schumacher and Häkkinen maintained their positions at the start, and then pulled away. Schumacher led until he hit the infamous 'Wall of Champions' at the last corner and retired. During the race, Irvine and Coulthard collided, and both spun. A further infringement led to the latter being given a stop-go penalty. This left Heinz-Harald Frentzen in second, only for him to crash heavily with a brake failure 4 laps from the end. This brought out the safety car until the end of the end of the race, thus making it the first ever race to finish under the safety car, with Häkkinen winning from a surprised Giancarlo Fisichella and the recovering Irvine.

Qualifying for the next race in France was disrupted by rain, and it resulted in Rubens Barrichello taking pole ahead of Jean Alesi's Sauber and Olivier Panis's Prost. Coulthard was fourth, Schumacher sixth and Häkkinen way down in 14th. The race was no drier, and the entire race was run in wet conditions. Barrichello led for the first few laps, but then Coulthard passed him only to retire with a gearbox failure. Häkkinen quickly charged up to second only to spin, and undo his work. Schumacher was now second, and soon passed Barrichello to take the lead. Schumacher pulled away, but then suffered an electrical problem which cost him a lot of time, and this gave the lead back to Barrichello. Häkkinen was now charging, and completed his comeback by passing Barrichello to lead. However, both he and Barrichello as well as  most other front-runners had to pit near the end for extra fuel, but third-placed Frentzen did not have to after his team gave him a full tank to fuel. Frentzen took the second win of his career, ahead of Häkkinen and Barrichello.

Normal service was resumed in the next race in Britain, with Häkkinen on pole ahead of Schumacher and Coulthard. Häkkinen started well, but Schumacher started badly and was passed by Coulthard and Irvine. He immediately tried to pass Irvine at Stowe, but a brake failure pitched him onto the wall at 200 mph. Although the car absorbed most of the impact, Schumacher was left with a broken leg. In fact, he did not know the race had already been stopped because Alessandro Zanardi had stalled. The race was restarted, and Schumacher's grid slot was empty. Häkkinen converted his pole into a lead, ahead of Irvine and Coulthard. Häkkinen pulled away from Irvine, and looked set to win until a wheel fell off his car. He pitted and rejoined, but retired soon after because it was too dangerous to continue. This gave the lead to Coulthard who had jumped Irvine in the stops. Coulthard went on to take a home victory, ahead of Irvine and Ralf Schumacher.

With a half of the championship complete, Häkkinen led the championship with 40 points. Schumacher was second with 32 even though he was expected to miss the rest of the season with his broken leg. Irvine also had 32 like his teammate, and clearly was going to be the new team leader. Frentzen was fourth with 26, Coulthard was fifth with 22, and Ralf was sixth with 19. In the Constructors' Championship, Ferrari led with 64, two ahead of McLaren with 62. Jordan were third with 31.

The news before the round in Austria was that Mika Salo was hired as Schumacher's replacement. The two McLarens were dominant in qualifying, Häkkinen on pole as usual with Coulthard second, and Irvine in third over a second behind. Häkkinen got off well, but was tipped into a spin at the second corner by his teammate, which knocked him down to last. Neither car was damaged, and Coulthard took the lead. Coulthard led for most of the race, but Irvine jumped him in the second round of stops to take the win ahead of the Scotsman. Häkkinen drove a superb race, charging from the back to finish third.

The German GP did not receive as much anticipation as one would expect as home hero Schumacher was missing, but it did not deter Häkkinen from taking his 8th pole of the season, with Frentzen splitting the McLarens. Häkkinen raced away, and Coulthard passed Frentzen but Salo, starting in fourth got in front of both of them. Coulthard put Salo under pressure, and tried to pass, but hit the Ferrari's tyre and damaged his front wing, which forced him to pit for repairs. Häkkinen was cruising, but his refuelling equipment malfunctioned during the stops, and his long stop pushed him down to fourth. He passed Frentzen, and set off after the Ferraris only to suffer a puncture which punted him into the wall. Irvine was let through by Salo, and took his second consecutive win, with Salo making it a Ferrari 1–2, and Frentzen finished third.

Round 11 was in Hungary, and Häkkinen took pole as usual, with Irvine alongside him and Coulthard third. Häkkinen and Irvine quickly raced away, while Coulthard got passed by Giancarlo Fisichella and Frentzen. Coulthard jumped both drivers in the stops, and then chased after Irvine, and the Ulsterman cracked under the pressure with 8 laps left, by running wide, giving second to Coulthard. Häkkinen cruised to victory, and Coulthard completed McLaren's 1–2, and Irvine settled for third.

The field went to Belgium next, and Häkkinen took his tenth pole of the season, with Coulthard in second, and Frentzen third. At the start, Häkkinen got away slowly, and so Coulthard was alongside. Coulthard did not lift, and the two McLarens touched, but Coulthard was in front. Coulthard was never headed and eased to victory, with Häkkinen running around in and finishing second, and Frenzen third. Irvine was fourth.

With three-quarters of the season complete, Häkkinen led the championship with 60 points, but now Irvine with 59 was only 1 point behind him. Coulthard was third with 46, and in with an outside chance. Frentzen was fourth with 40, Michael Schumacher who was still out with a broken leg was fifth with 32, and Ralf was sixth with 24. In the Constructors' Championship, the two consecutive 1–2 finishes had given McLaren the lead with 106 points. Ferrari with 97 was only 9 points behind them. Jordan was third with 47.

Häkkinen took pole for the Italian GP ahead of Frentzen and Coulthard. Häkkinen led into the first chicane and pulled away, helped by Alessandro Zanardi who was up to second holding up the rest of the field. Häkkinen was set to win until he spun off at the first corner on lap 30, giving the lead to Frentzen who went on to win ahead of Ralf and Salo, while Coulthard and Irvine were a lacklustre fifth and sixth.

For the 14th round of the season in  Europe, Frentzen took his first pole in 2 years, ahead of Coulthard and Häkkinen. At the start, Frentzen led Häkkinen and Coulthard into the first corner, but at the back Damon Hill suffered an electrical failure, causing Alexander Wurz to hit Pedro Diniz, which caused his Sauber to flip. There was a slight drizzle after 15 laps, and unlike others, Häkkinen pitted for wets. This was too early, and he lost a lot of time and had to pit again for dries. He rejoined a lap down. Irvine was stuck for 30 seconds on three wheels during his fuel stop, when his team couldn't find the fourth wheel. With a half of the race gone, Frentzen was leading Coulthard and Ralf. Frentzen's race cruelly ended with an electrical failure after his first stop. It started raining by then, and new leader Coulthard spun off and retired. This gave the lead to Ralf until he suffered a puncture, which dropped him to fifth. On the wet track, Fisichella inherited the lead, only to spin off himself and retire. The next leader was Johnny Herbert in the Stewart. The track dried out and Herbert won, ahead of Jarno Trulli's Prost and Rubens Barrichello's second Stewart. Late in the race, Irvine made a mistake while running sixth, and gave sixth to Häkkinen, who then went on to pass Marc Gené for fifth. Gené's teammate Luca Badoer was running 4th with 13 laps to go but had a gearbox failure, thus denying him of a points finish. Häkkinen thus took a two-point lead over Irvine going into the last two races.

The first ever Malaysian GP was the host of the penultimate round, and Schumacher had recovered and replaced Salo for the race. Schumacher took pole ahead of Irvine, with Coulthard and Häkkinen third and fourth. Irvine quickly raced away, while Schumacher purposely slowed down to keep both McLarens behind. Coulthard got in front of Schumacher, only for his car to break down. Schumacher kept Häkkinen behind, and prevented him from challenging Irvine. Irvine won with Schumacher completing the Ferrari 1–2, forcing Häkkinen to settle for third.

After the race, the Ferrari cars were found to be illegal by an FIA official and were disqualified, which would have the effect of making Häkkinen the world champion. Ferrari appealed and the FIA Court of Appeal in Paris later ruled that the cars were not illegal and the Ferraris were reinstated.

Irvine led the championship with 70 points, and Häkkinen with 66 was 4 points behind. A win for either driver would give them the championship. Frentzen was third with 51, Coulthard fourth with 48, Schumacher fifth with 38 and Ralf sixth with 33. In the Constructors' Championship, Ferrari led with 118 points, and McLaren were second with 114; Jordan with 58 were a lonely third.

The championship decider was in Japan. Häkkinen qualified in second, behind Schumacher while Irvine crashed in qualifying and was only fifth. Häkkinen took the lead at the start, while Irvine was fourth behind Olivier Panis. Häkkinen and Schumacher got away, while Panis held up the others. Panis was dealt with at the first round of stops, but now Irvine was behind Coulthard's McLaren. Coulthard slowed his pace, and held Irvine up, and the gap to Häkkinen increased. Irvine was finally released when Coulthard spun off, but was well over a minute behind Häkkinen. Schumacher was within 5 second of Häkkinen, and piled on the pressure but Häkkinen kept him at bay to win the race and the championship. Schumacher was second, and third for Irvine was not enough for him, but was enough to win the Constructors' Championship for Ferrari.

Häkkinen, with 76 points, was the Drivers' Champion of 1999, his second successive championship. Irvine, who had battled with Häkkinen throughout the season, was 2 points behind with a total of 74. Frentzen, with 54 points in total, was third. Coulthard was fourth with 48 points, Michael Schumacher was fifth with 44 points, even though he missed over a third of the season with his broken leg, and his brother, Ralf Schumacher, finished sixth with 35. In the Constructors' Championship, Ferrari, with 128 points, were champions, beating second-placed McLaren by 4 points. Jordan ended up in third with 61.

Results and standings

Grands Prix

Scoring system

Points were awarded to the top six finishers in each race as follows:

World Drivers' Championship standings

Notes:
 – Driver did not finish the Grand Prix but was classified, as he completed more than 90% of the race distance.
Where two or more drivers scored the same number of points, their positions in the Drivers' Championship were fixed according to the quality of their places. Under this system, one first place was better than any number of second places, one second place was better than any number of third places, etc. For drivers with 1 point or 0 points, one seventh place was better than any number of eighth places, etc.

World Constructors' Championship standings

Notes:
 – Driver did not finish the Grand Prix but was classified, as he completed more than 90% of the race distance.
Where two or more constructors scored the same number of points, their positions in the Constructors' Championship were fixed according to the quality of their places. Under this system, one first place was better than any number of second places, one second place was better than any number of third places, etc. For constructors with 1 point or 0 points, one seventh place was better than any number of eighth places, etc.

References

External links

 formula1.com – 1999 official driver standings (archived)
 formula1.com – 1999 official team standings (archived)

Formula One seasons
 
Formula 1